Nghi Son Refinery is the second planned oil refinery in Vietnam. Site-clearing for the project broke ground in 2008. Construction began on 23 October 2013, and refinery operations are targeted for 2017. The site-clearing phase entails the resettlement of 350 households with 1,500 people and the surface leveling of the area.

Technical features
Nghi Son refinery would have a designed capacity of 10 million tons of crude oil per year with possibility to increase the capacity to 20 million tons. It is expected to cost US$9 billion.  The refinery project will also include petrochemical complex, energy facilities, pipeline and storage systems. In addition to LPG, unleaded gasoline, kerosene, jet fuel, diesel and FO, the refinery is projected to produce bitumen, propylene and BTX as a raw material for the petrochemical industry.

The refinery will be supplied with crude oil imports from Kuwait.

Construction
The refinery is designed and built by a syndicate of EPC contractors including JGC Corporation and Chiyoda Corporation from Japan, GS Engineering & Construction Corporation and SK Engineering & Construction Co. from South Korea, Technip from France and Malaysia's Technip Geoproduction. 70% of the construction costs will be financed through the Japan Bank for International Cooperation. According to Bloomberg, JGC won the EPC contract to build the refinery in 2011.

Consortium
The project is developed by a consortium of international companies. Petrovietnam holds 25.1%, Idemitsu Kosan and Kuwait Petroleum International each hold a 35.1% each, and Mitsui Chemicals has the remaining 4.7% of shares. A contract to set up a joint venture was signed on 7 April 2008.

See also
 Dung Quat Refinery
 Long Son Refinery

References

External links
Aerial photo of refinery location
Nghi Son Refinery construction site photo

Oil refineries in Vietnam
Energy infrastructure completed in 2018
Buildings and structures in Thanh Hóa province